The 2019 Ferrari Challenge North America is the 25th season of Ferrari Challenge North America. The season consisted of 7 rounds, starting at the Circuit of the Americas on March 9 and ending at the Mugello Circuit on October 26.

Calendar

Entry list
All teams and drivers used the Ferrari 488 Challenge fitted with Pirelli tyres.

Trofeo Pirelli

Coppa Shell

Results and standings

Race results

Championship standings
Points were awarded to the top ten classified finishers as follows:

Trofeo Pirelli

Coppa Shell

‡ Driver ineligible for championship points.

See also
 2019 Finali Mondiali

References

External links
 Official website

North America 2019
Ferrari Challenge North America